Auburn is a city in and the county seat of Placer County, California, United States. Its population was 13,776 during the 2020 census. Auburn is known for its California Gold Rush history and is registered as a California Historical Landmark.

Auburn is part of the Sacramento metropolitan area.

History

 
Archaeological finds place the southwestern border for the prehistoric Martis people in the Auburn area. The indigenous Nisenan, an offshoot of the Maidu, were the first to establish a permanent settlement in the Auburn area.

In the spring of 1848, a group of French gold miners arrived and camped in what would later be known as the Auburn Ravine. This group was on its way to the gold fields in Coloma, California, and it included Francois Gendron, Philibert Courteau, and Claude Chana. The young Chana discovered gold on May 16, 1848. After finding the gold deposits in the soil, the trio decided to stay for more prospecting and mining.

Placer mining in the Auburn area was very good, with the camp first becoming known as the North Fork Dry Diggings. This name was changed to the Woods Dry Diggings, after John S. Wood settled down, built a cabin, and started to mine in the ravine. The area soon developed into a mining camp, and it was officially named Auburn in August 1849, by miners from Auburn, New York. By 1850, the town's population had grown to about 1,500 people, and in 1851, Auburn was chosen as the seat of Placer County. Gold mining operations moved up the ravine to the site of present-day Auburn. In 1865, the Central Pacific Railroad, the western leg of the First transcontinental railroad, reached Auburn, as it was being built east from Sacramento toward Ogden, Utah.

The restored Old Town has houses and retail buildings from the middle of the 19th century. The oldest fire station and the Post Office date from the Gold Rush years. Casual gold-mining accessories, as well as American Indian and Chinese artifacts, can also be viewed by visitors at the Placer County Museum.
Auburn was the home and birthplace of noted science fiction and fantasy poet and writer Clark Ashton Smith. A memorial to him is located near Old Town.

Geography

Auburn is situated in the Northern California foothills of the Sierra Nevada range, approximately 800 vertical feet above the confluence of the North Fork and Middle Fork of the American River. It is located between Sacramento and Reno, Nevada, along Interstate 80. Mountainous wilderness canyons and the western slope of the Sierra Nevada lie adjacent eastward, while gentle rolling foothills well-suited for agriculture lie to the west. The crest of the Sierra Nevada lies approximately  eastward, and the Central Valley lies approximately ten miles to the west.

Climate
Auburn has a hot-summer Mediterranean climate (Köppen Csa) that is characterized by cool, moist winters and hot, dry summers.

There are an average of 70 days with measurable precipitation.

Auburn's Köppen classification and climate similarities to locations such as Napa, California, and parts of Italy make it a suitable region for growing wine grapes. Auburn and the surrounding areas of Placer County are home to over 20 wineries.

Demographics

The 2010 United States Census reported that Auburn had a population of 13,330. The racial makeup of Auburn was 11,863 (89.0%) White, 100 (0.8%) African American, 129 (1.0%) Native American, 240 (1.8%) Asian, 9 (0.1%) Pacific Islander, 405 (3.0%) from other races, and 584 (4.4%) from two or more races. Hispanic or Latino of any race were 1,331 persons (10.0%).

The Census reported that 13,052 people (97.9% of the population) lived in households, 145 (1.1%) lived in non-institutionalized group quarters, and 133 (1.0%) were institutionalized.

There were 5,759 households, out of which 1,502 (26.1%) had children under the age of 18 living in them, 2,613 (45.4%) were opposite-sex married couples living together, 604 (10.5%) had a female householder with no husband present, 257 (4.5%) had a male householder with no wife present. There were 352 (6.1%) unmarried opposite-sex partnerships, and 33 (0.6%) same-sex married couples or partnerships. 1,845 households (32.0%) were made up of individuals, and 801 (13.9%) had someone living alone who was 65 years of age or older. The average household size was 2.27. There were 3,474 families (60.3% of all households); the average family size was 2.85.

The population was spread out, with 2,645 people (19.8%) under the age of 18, 1,031 people (7.7%) aged 18 to 24, 2,898 people (21.7%) aged 25 to 44, 4,224 people (31.7%) aged 45 to 64, and 2,532 people (19.0%) who were 65 years of age or older. The median age was 45.4 years. For every 100 females, there were 89.5 males. For every 100 females age 18 and over, there were 86.1 males.

The homeowner vacancy rate was 2.0%; the rental vacancy rate was 6.5%. 8,017 people (60.1% of the population) lived in owner-occupied housing units and 5,035 people (37.8%) lived in rental housing units.

Arts and culture

Landmarks

Auburn is home to Placer High School, which is one of the oldest high schools in California.

Local dentist Kenneth H. Fox's colossal sculptures are located throughout the town. The statues chronicle Auburn's history, such as a middle-aged Claude Chana gold panning in the nearby American River, and a Chinese laborer building the Transcontinental Railroad.

Hidden Falls Regional Park is located in nearby woodlands and contains 30-miles of multi-use trails.

Infrastructure

Transportation
Auburn is served by Amtrak passenger rail service a few times a day, and its railroad station is the eastern terminus of AMTRAK's Californian Capitol Corridor train. Interstate Highway 80 is the main east–west highway through this area, connecting Sacramento to the west and the Lake Tahoe/Reno areas to the east. This town can be reached through several interchanges on Interstate 80, three of which (exits 118, 119 A through C, and 120) are somewhat within the town limits. California Highway 49 is the main north–south highway through this area. Highway 49 connects Auburn with the towns of Grass Valley and Nevada City to its north, and Placerville to the south.

Auburn owns and operates this airport and an industrial site. The airport site covers  including an  industrial site. This airport has a single -long runway. General aviation services are available.

Notable people 

 Ben Nighthorse Campbell (1933–) Olympian, United States Senator
 Jean-Baptiste Charbonneau, (1805–866), explorer, Orleans Hotel proprietor in Auburn 1860–1866.
 Joseph James DeAngelo (1945–) who was convicted as the East Area Rapist in 2020. He was a Police officer in Auburn between 1976 and 1979, the same time as when the serial rapes occurred in Sacramento area.
 Jo Hamilton (1827–1904) former Attorney General of California, Trustee of the California State Library, and pioneer lawyer of Placer County, California.
 Clarence Hinkle (1880–1960) painter.
 George Lynch (born 1954) hard rock guitarist and songwriter, worked with heavy metal band Dokken.
 Isaiah Piñeiro (born 1995) professional basketball player.
 Mary Eulalie Fee Shannon (1824-1855), poet
 Clark Ashton Smith (1893–1961) writer and artist, one of the West Coast Romantics.
 Paul Takagi (1923–2015) sociologist, criminologist, and professor at the University of California, Berkeley, he was a Japanese-American prisoner at the Manzanar War Relocation Center.

In popular culture

Literature
 In John Steinbeck's novel Of Mice and Men, George and Lennie were raised in Auburn.

Film and television
The following films were, at least in part, shot in Auburn:
The Adventures of Rocky and Bullwinkle
Protocol
Breakdown
My Family
The Phantom
Phenomenon
Wisdom
xXx
Cinema Verite
The Ugly Truth

See also

Auburn State Recreation Area
Bernhard Museum Complex
Gold Country Museum

References

Further reading
Auburn, California: crossroads of historic gold country. (1973). [S.l: s.n.].
Borchardt, G. A., Rice, S. J., & Taylor, G. C. (1980). Paleosols overlying the Foothills fault system near Auburn, California. Sacramento: California Division of Mines and Geology.
Barieau, C. (1988). A self-guided walking tour to historic Auburn buildings: a guide to significant historical and architectural buildings of Auburn, California. Auburn, Calif: Auburn Letter House.
Sanborn, D. (2001). Chronology of Auburn, California. Auburn, CA: Auburn Sesquicentennial Committee.

External links

Auburn, CA - Information & Resources
Auburn Chamber of Commerce

 
Cities in Placer County, California
County seats in California
Cities in Sacramento metropolitan area
Incorporated cities and towns in California
Populated places established in 1888
1888 establishments in California